Hampus Jönsson (born 27 October 1991) is a retired Swedish footballer who last played for Bjärreds IF as a defender.

Jönsson left Allsvenskan side Brommapojkarna in 2013, signing a 1-year contract with IK Frej in January 2014. When the contract expired, he decided to move to Lund to begin study at university, ending his professional football career.

In 2016, he played a couple of months with local side Bjärreds IF in Division 4.

References

External links
 

1991 births
Living people
Swedish footballers
Allsvenskan players
Superettan players
IF Brommapojkarna players
IK Frej players
Gröndals IK players
Association football defenders